Eduard Kakosyan (born 4 June 1986), is an Armenian professional football midfielder.

Club career
Eduard grew up being part FC Banants's youth team. He moved up to the main squad mainly during the 2007 and 2008 seasons. In 2007, he had a large contribution in Banants's Armenian Cup glory. Since 2009, he has been a regular for the main team.

Club career statistics

National team
Eduard was a member of the Armenia U-21 team, although he only made 1 appearance. He made his debut for the senior squad in a friendly against Moldova on 12 August 2009.

Achievements
Armenian Cup with FC Banants: 2007

External links
Profile at ffa.am

Armenian footballers
Armenia international footballers
Armenian Premier League players
FC Urartu players
Footballers from Yerevan
Living people
1986 births
Association football midfielders